is a former Japanese football player.

Club statistics

References

External links

1980 births
Living people
Osaka University of Health and Sport Sciences alumni
Association football people from Hokkaido
Sportspeople from Sapporo
Japanese footballers
J1 League players
J2 League players
Cerezo Osaka players
JEF United Chiba players
Montedio Yamagata players
Shonan Bellmare players
Giravanz Kitakyushu players
Japanese people of Austrian descent
Association football midfielders